Karl August von Solbrig (17 September 1809, Fürth – 31 May 1872, Munich) was a German physician and psychiatrist.

He studied medicine at the universities of Munich and Erlangen, where he also served as an assistant to pathologist Adolph Henke. From 1834 he took a study trip during which he investigated the asylum systems of Germany, France and Belgium. Around 1836 he worked for several months as an assistant to psychiatrist Karl Wilhelm Ideler at the Charité hospital in Berlin, then afterwards settled as a general practitioner in his hometown of Fürth. In 1846 he was named director of the newly founded district mental hospital in Erlangen, and three years later, was named an honorary professor at the university.

During the 1850s he made plans for the construction of a new district mental hospital near Munich, and in 1859, he became the first director of the Oberbayerische Kreis-Irrenanstalt (Upper Bavarian District Mental Hospital) in Munich. From 1864 up until his death in 1872, he was a full professor of psychiatry at the University of Munich. He is credited with establishing psychiatry as a specific medical discipline at the faculty of medicine in Munich. In 1865, he became an honorary member of the Société médicale allemande de Paris.

Published works 
 Verbrechen und Wahnsinn, Ein Beitrag zur Diagnostik zweifelhafter Seelenstörungen, 1867 – Crime and insanity. A contribution to the diagnosis of dubious mental disorders.

References 

1809 births
1872 deaths
University of Erlangen-Nuremberg alumni
Academic staff of the University of Erlangen-Nuremberg
Ludwig Maximilian University of Munich alumni
Academic staff of the Ludwig Maximilian University of Munich
German psychiatrists
People from Fürth